Davoud Arghavani (is a former Iranian football player. He played for Iran national football team in 1958 Asian Games.

Club career
He previously played for  Taj.

References

External links

 Davoud Arghavani at TeamMelli.com

Iranian footballers
Esteghlal F.C. players
Living people
Footballers at the 1958 Asian Games
Association football midfielders
Year of birth missing (living people)
Asian Games competitors for Iran
Iran international footballers